is a railway station in the city of Fukushima, Fukushima Prefecture, Japan operated by Fukushima Kōtsū.

Lines

Station layout

Izumi Station has one island platform with an elevated station building serving as a footbridge. Formerly a staffed station, it is now unstaffed. It is also the only station on the Iizaka Line that utilizes a bridge overpass over the tracks. Inside, there is a proof-of-departure ticket machine, a bench, and a beverage vending machine.

Platforms

Adjacent stations

History
Izumi Station was opened on March 4, 1940.

Surrounding area
Izumi Station is only approximately 300 meters from the neighboring Iwashiroshimizu Station.
Izumi Elementary School

See also
 List of railway stations in Japan

External links

  

Railway stations in Japan opened in 1940
Railway stations in Fukushima Prefecture
Fukushima Kōtsū Iizaka Line
Fukushima (city)